All Quiet on the Western Front is a novel by Erich Maria Remarque, a German veteran of World War I. The book describes the German soldiers' extreme physical and mental trauma during the war as well as the detachment from civilian life felt by many upon returning home from the war.

The novel was first published in November and December 1928 in the German newspaper  and in book form in late January 1929. The book and its sequel, The Road Back (1930), were among the books banned and burned in Nazi Germany. All Quiet on the Western Front sold 2.5 million copies in 22 languages in its first 18 months in print.

Three film adaptations of the book have been made, each of which was lauded. The 1930 American adaptation, directed by Lewis Milestone, won two Academy Awards. The 1979 British-American adaptation, a television film by Delbert Mann, won a Golden Globe Award and an Emmy Award. The 2022 German adaptation, directed by Edward Berger, won four Academy Awards.

Title and translation
The English translation by Arthur Wesley Wheen gives the title as All Quiet on the Western Front. The literal translation of "Im Westen nichts Neues" is "Nothing New in the West," with "West" being the Western Front; the phrase refers to the content of an official communiqué at the end of the novel.

Brian Murdoch's 1993 translation rendered the phrase as "there was nothing new to report on the Western Front" within the narrative. However, in the foreword, he explains his retention of the original book title:

Although it does not match the German exactly, Wheen's title has justly become part of the English language and is retained here with gratitude.

The phrase "all quiet on the Western Front" has become a colloquial expression meaning stagnation, or lack of visible change, in any context.

Murdoch also explains how, due to the time it was published, Wheen's translation was obliged to Anglicise some lesser-known German references and lessen the impact of certain passages, while omitting others entirely. Murdoch's translation is more accurate to the original text and completely unexpurgated.

Plot summary
The book centers on Paul Bäumer, a German soldier on the Western Front during World War I. At the start of the book, Paul lives with his parents and sister in a charming German village. He attends school, where the patriotic speeches of his teacher Kantorek lead the whole class to volunteer for the Imperial German Army shortly after the start of The Great War. Bäumer arrives at the Western Front with his friends and schoolmates (Leer, Müller, Kropp, Kemmerich and a number of other characters). There, they meet Stanislaus Katczinsky, an older soldier nicknamed Kat, who becomes Paul's mentor. 

While fighting at the front, Bäumer and his comrades engage in frequent battles and endure the treacherous and filthy conditions of trench warfare. The battles fought here have no names and seem to have little overall significance, except for the impending possibility of injury or death. Only meager pieces of land are gained, which are often lost again later. Remarque often refers to the living soldiers as old and dead, emotionally drained and shaken. "We are not youth any longer. We don't want to take the world by storm. We are fleeing from ourselves, from our life. We were eighteen and had begun to love life and the world; and we had to shoot it to pieces."

Paul visits home, and the contrast with civilian life highlights the cost of the war on his psyche. The town has not changed since he went off to war, but he has: he finds that he does "not belong here anymore, it is a foreign world". He feels disconnected from most of the townspeople. His father asks him "stupid and distressing" questions about his war experiences, not understanding "that a man cannot talk of such things". An old schoolmaster lectures him about strategy and advancing to Paris while insisting that Paul and his friends know only their "own little sector" of the war but nothing of the big picture.

Indeed, the only person he remains connected to is his dying mother, with whom he shares a tender, yet restrained relationship. The night before he is to return from leave, he stays up with her, exchanging small expressions of love and concern for each other. He thinks to himself, "Ah! Mother, Mother! How can it be that I must part from you? Here I sit and there you are dying; we have so much to say, and we shall never say it." In the end, he concludes that he "ought never to have come [home] on leave".

Paul is glad to return and reunite with his comrades. Soon after, he volunteers to go on a patrol and kills a man in hand-to-hand combat for the first time. He watches the man die slowly in agony for hours. He is remorseful and devastated, asking for forgiveness from the man's corpse. He later confesses to Kat and Albert, who try to comfort him and reassure him that it is only part of the war. Afterwards, they are sent on what Paul calls a "good job". They must guard a supply depot in a village that was evacuated due to being shelled too heavily. During this time, the men are able to adequately feed themselves, unlike the near-starvation conditions in the German trenches. In addition, the men enjoy themselves while living off the spoils from the village and officers' luxuries from the supply depot (such as fine cigars). While evacuating the villagers (enemy civilians), Paul and Albert are taken by surprise by artillery fired at the civilian convoy and are wounded by a shell. On the train back home, Albert takes a turn for the worse and cannot complete the journey, and instead is sent off the train to recuperate in a Catholic hospital. By a combination of bartering and manipulation, Paul manages to stay together with Albert. Albert eventually has his leg amputated, while Paul is deemed fit for service and returned to the front.

By now, the war is nearing its end and the German Army is retreating. In despair, Paul watches as his friends fall one by one. Kat's death is the last straw that finally causes Paul to lose his will to live. In the final chapter, he comments that peace is coming soon, but he does not see the future as bright and shining with hope. Paul feels that he has no aims left in life and that their generation will be different and misunderstood.

In October 1918, Paul is finally killed on a remarkably peaceful day. The situation report from the frontline states a simple phrase: "All quiet on the Western Front." Paul's corpse displays a calm expression on its face, "as though almost glad the end had come."

Themes

At the beginning of the book, Remarque writes, "This book is to be neither an accusation nor a confession, and least of all an adventure, for death is not an adventure to those who stand face to face with it. It will try simply to tell of a generation of men who, even though they may have escaped (its) shells, were destroyed by the war." The book does not focus on heroic stories of bravery, but rather gives a view of the conditions in which the soldiers find themselves. The monotony between battles, the constant threat of artillery fire and bombardments, the struggle to find food, the lack of training of young recruits (meaning lower chances of survival), and the overarching role of random chance in the lives and deaths of the soldiers are described in detail.

One of the major themes of the novel is the difficulty experienced by former soldiers trying to revert to civilian life after having experienced extreme combat situations. This internal destruction can be found as early as the first chapter as Paul comments that, although all the boys are young, their youth has already left them. In addition, the massive loss of life and negligible gains from the fighting are constantly emphasized. Soldiers' lives are thrown away by their commanding officers who are stationed comfortably away from the front, ignorant of and indifferent to the suffering and terror of the front lines.

Another major theme is the concept of blind nationalism. Remarque often emphasizes that the boys were not forced to join the war effort against their will, but rather by a sense of patriotism and pride. Kantorek called Paul's platoon the "Iron Youth", teaching his students a romanticized version of warfare with glory and duty to the Fatherland. It is only when the boys go to war and have to live and fight in dirty, cramped trenches with little protection from enemy bullets and shells while contending with hunger and sickness that they realize just how dispiriting it is to actually serve in the army.

Main characters

Paul Bäumer
The main character and central figure of the novel.

Albert Kropp
Kropp is in Paul's class at school and is described as the clearest thinker of the group as well as the smallest. Kropp is wounded towards the end of the novel and undergoes a leg amputation. Both he and Bäumer end up spending time in a Catholic hospital together, Bäumer suffering from shrapnel wounds to the leg and arm. Although Kropp initially plans to commit suicide if he requires an amputation, he postponed suicide because of the strength of military camaraderie and a lack of a revolver. Kropp and Bäumer part ways when Bäumer is recalled to his regiment after recovering. Paul comments that saying farewell was "very hard, but it is something a soldier learns to deal with."

Haie Westhus
Haie is tall and strong with a good sense of humor, and a peat-digger by profession. His size and behavior make him seem older than Paul, yet he is the same age as Paul and his school-friends, who are roughly 19 at the start of the book. During combat, he is fatally injured in his back (Chapter 6)—the resulting wound is large enough for Paul to see Haie's breathing lung while Himmelstoß (Himmelstoss) carries him to safety. He later dies of this injury.

Friedrich Müller
Müller is one of Bäumer's classmates, and is 19 when he also volunteers to join the German army. Carrying his old school books with him to the battlefield, he constantly reminds himself of the importance of learning and education. Even while under enemy fire, he "mutters propositions in physics." He takes a liking to Kemmerich's boots and inherits them when Kemmerich dies early in the novel. He is killed later after being shot point-blank in the stomach with a "light pistol" (flare gun). As he was dying "quite conscious and in terrible pain", he gave his boots which he inherited from Kemmerich to Paul.

Stanislaus "Kat" Katczinsky
Katczinsky, a recalled reserve militiaman, was a cobbler in civilian life. He is older than Paul Bäumer and his comrades, about 40 years old, and serves as their leadership figure. He also represents a literary model highlighting the differences between the younger and older soldiers. While the older men have already had a life of professional and personal experience before the war, Paul and the men of his age have had little life experience or time for personal growth.

Kat is well known for his ability to scavenge nearly any item needed, especially food. At one point he secures four boxes of lobster. Paul describes Kat as possessing a sixth sense. One night, Paul along with a group of other soldiers are held up in a factory with neither rations nor comfortable bedding. Katczinsky leaves for a short while, returning with straw to put over the bare wires of the beds. Later, to feed the hungry men, Kat brings bread, a bag of horse flesh, a lump of fat, a pinch of salt and a pan in which to cook the food.

Kat is hit by shrapnel near the end of the story, leaving him with a smashed shin. Paul carries him back to camp on his back, only to discover upon their arrival that a stray splinter had hit Kat in the back of the head and killed him on the way. He is thus the last of Paul's close friends to die in battle. It is Kat's death that eventually makes Bäumer indifferent as to whether he survives the war or not, yet certain that he can face the rest of his life without fear. "Let the months and the years come, they can take nothing from me, they can take nothing more. I am so alone, and so without hope that I can confront them without fear."

Tjaden 
One of Bäumer's non-schoolmate friends. Before the war, Tjaden was a locksmith. A big eater with a grudge against the former postman-turned-corporal Himmelstoß (thanks to his strict "disciplinary actions"), he manages to forgive Himmelstoß later in the book. Throughout the book, Paul frequently remarks on how much of an eater he is, yet somehow manages to stay as "thin as a rake". He appears in the sequel, The Road Back.

Secondary characters

Kantorek
Kantorek is the schoolmaster of Paul and his friends, including Kropp, Leer, Müller, and Behm. Behaving "in a way that cost [him] nothing," Kantorek is a strong supporter of the war and encourages Bäumer and other students in his class to join the war effort. 

Kantorek is a hypocrite, urging the young men he teaches to fight in the name of patriotism, while not voluntarily enlisting himself. In a twist of fate, Kantorek is later drafted. He reluctantly joins the ranks of his former students, where he is drilled and taunted by Mittelstädt, one of the students he had earlier persuaded to enlist.

Peter Leer
Leer is an intelligent soldier in Bäumer's company, and one of his classmates. He is very popular with women; when he and his comrades meet three French women, he is the first to seduce one of them. Bäumer describes Leer's ability to attract women by saying "Leer is an old hand at the game". In chapter 11, Leer is hit by a shell fragment, which also hits Bertinck. The shrapnel tears open Leer's hip, causing him to bleed to death quickly. His death causes Paul to ask himself, "What use is it to him now that he was such a good mathematician in school?"

Bertinck
Lieutenant Bertinck is the leader of Bäumer's company. His men have a great respect for him, and Bertinck has great respect for his men. In the beginning of the book, he permits them to eat the rations of the men that had been killed in action, standing up to the chef Ginger who allowed them only their allotted share. Bertinck is genuinely despondent when he learns that few of his men had survived an engagement.

When he and the other characters are trapped in a trench under heavy attack, Bertinck, who has been injured in the firefight, spots a flamethrower team advancing on them. He gets out of cover and takes aim on the flamethrower but misses, and gets hit by enemy fire. With his next shot he kills the flamethrower, and immediately afterwards an enemy shell explodes on his position blowing off his chin. The same explosion also fatally wounds Leer.

Himmelstoß
Sergeant der Reserve Himmelstoß (which translates as "Heaven-Bound") was a village postman before being mobilised for the war and securing a position as a Sergeant in the Landwehr (Reserves of persons 28-39). Himmelstoß is a power-hungry martinet who compensated for his lack of social standing by abusing his position as the Training NCO for the men under his control, taking sadistic pleasure in punishing the minor infractions of his trainees during their basic training in preparation for their deployment. He had a special contempt for Paul and his friends, because they knew him as their local postman.  Paul later figures that the training taught by Himmelstoß made them "hard, suspicious, pitiless, and tough" but most importantly it taught them comradeship. Bäumer and his comrades exact their revenge on Himmelstoß, mercilessly whipping him on the night before they depart for the front.

Himmelstoß later joins them at the front, revealing himself as a coward by pretending to be wounded because of a scratch on his face. Paul Bäumer beats him because of it and when a lieutenant comes along looking for men for a trench charge, Himmelstoß joins and leads the charge. He carries Haie Westhus's body to Bäumer after he is fatally wounded. Matured and repentant through his experiences, Himmelstoß later asks for forgiveness from his previous charges. As he becomes the new staff cook, to prove his friendship he secures two pounds of sugar for Bäumer and half a pound of butter for Tjaden.

In the 1979 film adaptation, he is referred to as "Corporal" and wears a post 1941 shoulderboard for "Unteroffizier", a very junior NCO. In the book, he was a "Sergeant" or "Unterfeldwebel", a rank reserved for long serving "unteroffizieren" who fulfilled a staff role such as quartermaster, cook, clerks etc.

Detering
Detering is a farmer who constantly longs to return to his wife and farm. He is fond of horses and is angered when he sees them used in combat. He says, "It is of the vilest baseness to use horses in the war," when the group hears several wounded horses writhe and scream for a long time before dying during a bombardment. He tries to shoot them to put them out of their misery, but is stopped by Kat to keep their current position hidden. He is driven to desert when he sees a cherry tree in blossom, which reminds him of home. He is found by military police and court-martialed and is never heard from again.

Josef Hamacher
Hamacher is a patient at the Catholic hospital where Paul and Albert Kropp are temporarily stationed. He has an intimate knowledge of the workings of the hospital. He also has a "Special Permit", certifying him as sporadically not responsible for his actions due to a head wound, though he is clearly quite sane and exploiting his permit so he can stay in the hospital and away from the war as long as possible.

Franz Kemmerich
Just 19 years old, Franz Kemmerich had enlisted with his best friend and classmate, Bäumer. Kemmerich is shot in the leg early in the story; his injured leg has to be amputated, and he dies shortly after. In anticipation of Kemmerich's imminent death, Müller was eager to get his boots. While in the hospital, someone steals Kemmerich's watch that he intended to give to his mother, causing him great distress and prompting him to ask about his watch every time his friends visit him in the hospital. Paul later finds the watch and hands it over to Kemmerich's mother, and lies to her that Franz died instantly and painlessly.

Joseph Behm
Youthful and overweight, Behm was the only student in Paul's class that was not quickly influenced by Kantorek's patriotism to join the war. Eventually, after pressure from friends and Kantorek, he joins the war. He is the first of Paul's friends to die. He is blinded in no man's land and believed to be dead by his friends. The next day, when he is seen walking blindly around no man's land, it is discovered that he was only unconscious, but he is killed before he can be rescued.

Publication and reception

From November 10 to December 9, 1928, All Quiet on the Western Front was published in serial form in Vossische Zeitung magazine. It was released in book form the following year to great success, selling one and a half million copies that same year. It was the best-selling work of fiction in America for the year 1929, according to Publishers Weekly. Although publishers had worried that interest in World War I had waned more than 10 years after the armistice, Remarque's realistic depiction of trench warfare from the perspective of young soldiers struck a chord with the war's survivors—soldiers and civilians alike—and provoked strong reactions, both positive and negative, around the world.

With All Quiet on the Western Front, Remarque emerged as an eloquent spokesman for a generation that had been, in his own words, "destroyed by war, even though it might have escaped its shells." Remarque's harshest critics, in turn, were his countrymen, many of whom felt the book denigrated the German war effort, and that Remarque had exaggerated the horrors of war to further his pacifist agenda. The strongest voices against Remarque came from the emerging Nazi Party and its ideological allies. In 1933, when the Nazis rose to power, All Quiet on the Western Front became one of the first degenerate books to be publicly burnt; in 1930, screenings of the Academy Award-winning film based on the book were met with Nazi-organized protests and mob attacks on both movie theatres and audience members.

Objections to Remarque's portrayal of the World War I German soldiers were not limited to those of the Nazis in 1933. Dr.  was concerned about Remarque's depiction of the medical personnel as being inattentive, uncaring, or absent from frontline action. Kroner was specifically worried that the book would perpetuate German stereotypes abroad that had subsided since the First World War. He offered the following clarification: "People abroad will draw the following conclusions: if German doctors deal with their own fellow countrymen in this manner, what acts of inhumanity will they not perpetuate against helpless prisoners delivered up into their hands or against the populations of occupied territory?"

A fellow patient of Remarque's in the military hospital in Duisburg objected to the negative depictions of the nuns and patients and to the general portrayal of soldiers: "There were soldiers to whom the protection of homeland, protection of house and homestead, protection of family were the highest objective, and to whom this will to protect their homeland gave the strength to endure any extremities."

These criticisms suggest that experiences of the war and the personal reactions of individual soldiers to their experiences may be more diverse than Remarque portrays them; however, it is beyond question that Remarque gives voice to a side of the war and its experience that was overlooked or suppressed at the time. This perspective is crucial to understanding the true effects of World War I. The evidence can be seen in the lingering depression that Remarque and many of his friends and acquaintances were suffering a decade later.

The book was also banned in other European countries on the grounds that it was considered anti-war propaganda; Austrian soldiers were forbidden from reading the book in 1929, and Czechoslovakia banned it from its military libraries. The Italian translation was also banned in 1933. When the Nazis were re-militarizing Germany, the book was banned as it was deemed counterproductive to German rearmament. In contrast, All Quiet on the Western Front was trumpeted by pacifists as an anti-war book. 

Remarque makes a point in the opening statement that the novel does not advocate any political position, but is merely an attempt to describe the experiences of the soldier.

Much of the literary criticism came from Salomo Friedlaender, who wrote a book Hat Erich Maria Remarque wirklich gelebt? "Did Erich Maria Remarque really live?" (under the pen name Mynona), which was, in its turn, criticized in: Hat Mynona wirklich gelebt? "Did Mynona really live?" by Kurt Tucholsky. Friedlaender's criticism was mainly personal in nature—he attacked Remarque as being egocentric and greedy. Remarque publicly stated that he wrote All Quiet on the Western Front for personal reasons, not for profit, as Friedlaender had charged.

Adaptations

Film

 All Quiet on the Western Front, a 1930 American film directed by Lewis Milestone, starring Louis Wolheim, Lew Ayres, John Wray, Arnold Lucy, and Ben Alexander. Recipient of two Oscars, including Best Picture at the 3rd Academy Awards.
 All Quiet on the Western Front, a 2022 German film directed by Edward Berger, starring Felix Kammerer and Albrecht Schuch. Nominated for nine Oscars, including Best Picture, at the 95th Academy Awards, and winning seven British Academy Film Awards and four Oscars.

Television film
 All Quiet on the Western Front, a 1979 CBS television film by Delbert Mann, starring Richard Thomas and Ernest Borgnine.

Music
 "All Quiet on the Western Front", a song from Elton John's 1982 album Jump Up!, written by Elton and Bernie Taupin.

Radio
 All Quiet on the Western Front, a 2008 radio adaptation broadcast on BBC Radio 3, starring Robert Lonsdale and Shannon Graney, written by Dave Sheasby, and directed by David Hunter.

Audiobooks 
 All Quiet on the Western Front, a 2000 Recorded Books audiobook of the text, read by Frank Muller.
 All Quiet on the Western Front, a 2010 Hachette Audio UK audiobook narrated by Tom Lawrence.

Comics
 "All Quiet on the Western Front", a 1952 comic book adaptation as part of the Classics Illustrated series.

See also

 Bildungsroman
 List of books with anti-war themes

References

External links

 CliffsNotes
 Spark Notes
 Schneider, Thomas: All Quiet on the Western Front (novel) (2014) at 1914–1918-online: International Encyclopedia of the First World War.

1929 German-language novels
1929 German novels
Anti-war novels
Censored books
German novels adapted into films
Novels adapted into comics
German novels adapted into television shows
Novels adapted into radio programs
Novels by Erich Maria Remarque
Novels first published in serial form
Works originally published in Vossische Zeitung
Novels set during World War I
Novels set in Europe
Little, Brown and Company books